John Francis Dominic Wright (born 13 August 1933) is an English former footballer who played as a goalkeeper in the Football League for Colchester United.

Career

Born in Aldershot, Wright joined Colchester United from local amateur forms in May 1952, becoming a part-time professional whilst on National Service. He was a serviceman when he made his first-team debut for the club during the 1954–55 season, a 5–3 defeat to Southampton at Layer Road on 30 April 1955.

Four of Wright's five first-team appearances for Colchester came during his conscription, largely down to the consistency of Percy Ames as he clocked up four consecutive seasons without missing a game for the club. Wright waited patiently for his next chance, which was to be his final professional game, bringing an end to Ames' string of 236 consecutive appearances. In the game, Wright saved a penalty from Bill Myerscough but the club still lost 2–0 to Coventry City on 14 January 1961.

Wright decided to leave Colchester at the end of the 1960–61 season, with nine years of service and just five appearances to his name. He joined the police force and played locally for Great Bentley, but eventually left the force in summer 1963, going to work for the electricity board and joining Clacton Town where he lived.

References

1933 births
Living people
Sportspeople from Aldershot
English footballers
Association football goalkeepers
Colchester United F.C. players
F.C. Clacton players
English Football League players
Footballers from Hampshire